N. James Taylor was an American college football player.

College football
Taylor was a prominent tackle for the Georgia Bulldogs football team of the University of Georgia. When John Fletcher went down with injury, Taylor was acting captain of the 1924 team. He was selected All-Southern the same year, as well as a third-team All-American by Norman E. Brown.

References

Georgia Bulldogs football players
All-Southern college football players
American football tackles
Players of American football from Georgia (U.S. state)
People from Hazlehurst, Georgia